Cannan is a surname of Manx origin, and may refer to:

 David Cannan
 Denis Cannan
 Edwin Cannan, British economist
 Gilbert Cannan
 James Harold Cannan
 Joanna Cannan
John Cannan, a British convicted murderer
 May Wedderburn Cannan
 Ron Cannan

See also
 Cannon (surname)
  Cannan (region)
 Canaan (disambiguation)
 Canan

Manx-language surnames